The 2016 Rally Sweden (formally known as the 64. Rally Sweden) was a motor racing event for rally cars that was held over three days between 12 and 14 February 2016. It marked the sixty-fourth running of the Rally Sweden, and was the second round of the 2016 World Rally Championship, WRC-2 and WRC-3 seasons.

Due to a lack of snow in the area, eight Special Stages were cancelled prior to the start of the rally, including the opening Super Special stage and all of day three stages apart from the final Power Stage. The penultimate stage, SS20, was cancelled during the event. Of the 21 scheduled stages, only 12 were run.

Defending World Champion Sébastien Ogier started won his second consecutive rally of the season and his third Rally Sweden victory.

Entry list

Results

Event standings

Special stages

Power Stage
The "Power stage" was a  stage at the end of the rally.

Championship standings after the event

WRC

Drivers' Championship standings

Manufacturers' Championship standings

Other

WRC2 Drivers' Championship standings

WRC3 Drivers' Championship standings

References

External links

 
 The official website of the World Rally Championship
 Results at eWRC.com

Sweden
Swedish Rally
Rally